Stary Las  (German Altewalde) is a village in the administrative district of Gmina Głuchołazy, within Nysa County, Opole Voivodeship, in south-western Poland, close to the Czech border.

The village has a population of 720.

References

Stary Las